The World Conference on Transport Research Society (WCTRS) is an international research organization dedicated to transportation research. The scope of the society is multi-modal, multi-disciplinary, and multi-sectorial transportation research. The Society organizes every three years the World Conferences on Transportation Research in different parts of the world. The WCTRS has representatives and members in 67 countries and geographical areas around the World. Currently Professor Tae Hoon Oum from the University of British Columbia (Canada) is the president.

The Society and the Conference intend to play a strong leadership role in bridging the gaps between research and practice. The objective of the WCTRS is to provide a forum for the interchange of ideas among transportation researchers, managers, policy makers, and educators from all over the world, from a perspective which is multi-modal, multi-disciplinary, and multi-sectorial.

Conferences
The WCTRS organizes a triennial research conference. The next World Conference on Transportation Research will be organized in Montréal, Québec, Canada and will take place from July 17 to 21, 2023.

Previous conferences took place in Europe, the Americas, Asia, and Oceania
 16th WCTR : Montréal, Canada, 2023
 15th WCTR : Mumbai, India, 2019
 14th WCTR : Shanghai, China, 2016
 13th WCTR : Rio de Janeiro, Brazil, 2013 
 12th WCTR : Lisbon, Portugal, 2010
 11th WCTR : Berkeley, USA, 2007
 10th WCTR : Istanbul, Turkey, 2004
 9th WCTR : Seoul, Korea, 2001 
 8th WCTR : Antwerp, Belgium, 1998 
 7th WCTR : Sydney, Australia, 1995
 6th WCTR : Lyon, France, 1992 
 5th WCTR : Yokohama, Japan, 1989 
 4th WCTR : Vancouver, Canada, 1986 
 3rd WCTR : Hamburg, Germany, 1983 
 2nd WCTR : London, England, 1980 
 1st WCTR : Rotterdam, Netherlands, 1977 
 Pre-WCTR conference : Bruges, Belgium, 1973

See also
 Transportation Research Board

References

https://www.wctrs-society.com/conferences/

External links

Organizations established in 1977
Transport research organizations